Tempered or toughened glass  is a type of safety glass processed by controlled thermal or chemical treatments to increase its strength compared with normal glass. Tempering puts the outer surfaces into compression and the interior into tension. Such stresses cause the glass, when broken, to shatter into small granular chunks instead of splintering into jagged shards as ordinary annealed glass does. The granular chunks are less likely to cause injury.

Tempered glass is used for its safety and strength in a variety of applications, including passenger vehicle windows, shower doors, aquariums, architectural glass doors and tables, refrigerator trays, mobile phone screen protectors, bulletproof glass components, diving masks, and plates and cookware.

Properties 

Tempered glass is about four times stronger than annealed glass. The greater contraction of the inner layer during manufacturing induces compressive stresses in the surface of the glass balanced by tensile stresses in the body of the glass. Fully tempered 6-mm thick glass must have either a minimum surface compression of 69 MPa (10 000 psi) or an edge compression of not less than 67 MPa (9 700 psi). For it to be considered safety glass, the surface compressive stress should exceed . As a result of the increased surface stress, when broken the glass breaks into small rounded chunks as opposed to sharp jagged shards.

Compressive surface stresses give tempered glass increased strength. Annealed glass has almost no internal stress and usually forms microscopic cracks on its surface. Tension applied to the glass can drive crack propagation which, once begun, concentrates tension at the tip of the crack driving crack propagation at the speed of sound through the glass. Consequently, annealed glass is fragile and breaks into irregular and sharp pieces. The compressive stresses on the surface of tempered glass contain flaws, preventing their propagation or expansion.

Any cutting or grinding must be done prior to tempering. Cutting, grinding, and sharp impacts after tempering will cause the glass to fracture.

The strain pattern resulting from tempering can be observed by viewing through an optical polarizer, such as a pair of polarizing sunglasses.

Uses 
 

Tempered glass is used when strength, thermal resistance, and safety are important considerations. Passenger vehicles, for example, have all three requirements. Since they are stored outdoors, they are subject to constant heating and cooling as well as dramatic temperature changes throughout the year. Moreover, they must withstand small impacts from road debris such as stones as well as road accidents. Because large, sharp glass shards would present additional and unacceptable danger to passengers, tempered glass is used so that if broken, the pieces are blunt and mostly harmless. The windscreen or windshield is instead made of laminated glass, which will not shatter into pieces when broken while side windows and the rear windshield have historically been made of tempered glass. Some newer luxury vehicles have laminated side windows to meet occupancy retention regulations, anti-theft purposes, or sound-deadening purposes. 

Other typical applications of tempered glass include:

 Balcony doors 
 Athletic facilities
 Swimming pools
 Façades
 Shower doors and bathroom areas
 Exhibition areas and displays
 Computer towers or computer cases (see:
 Enthusiast computing #Computer cases and
 Case modding #Window mods).
 Mobile phone screen protectors

Buildings and structures 
Tempered glass is also used in buildings for unframed assemblies (such as frameless glass doors), structurally loaded applications, and any other application that would become dangerous in the event of human impact. Building codes in the United States require tempered or laminated glass in several situations including some skylights, glass installed near doorways and stairways, large windows, windows which extend close to floor level, sliding doors, elevators, fire department access panels, and glass installed near swimming pools.

Household uses
Tempered glass is also used in the home. Some common household furniture and appliances that use tempered glass are frameless shower doors, glass table tops, glass shelves, cabinet glass and glass for fireplaces.

Food service 

"Rim-tempered" indicates that a limited area, such as the rim of the glass or plate, is tempered and is popular in food service.  However, there are also specialist manufacturers that offer a fully tempered/toughened drinkware solution that can bring increased benefits in the form of strength and thermal shock resistance.  In some countries these products are specified in venues that require increased performance levels or have a requirement for a safer glass due to intense usage.

Tempered glass has also seen increased usage in bars and pubs, particularly in the United Kingdom and Australia, to prevent broken glass being used as a weapon. Tempered glass products can be found in hotels, bars, and restaurants to reduce breakages and increase safety standards.

Cooking and baking 
Some forms of tempered glass are used for cooking and baking.  Manufacturers and brands include Glasslock, Pyrex, Corelle, and Arc International. This is also the type of glass used for oven doors.

Touchscreen devices 
Most touchscreen mobile devices use some form of toughened glass (such as Corning's Gorilla Glass), but there are also separate tempered screen protectors for touchscreen devices sold as an accessory.

Manufacturing 

Tempered glass can be made from annealed glass via a thermal tempering process. The glass is then rapidly cooled with forced air drafts while the inner portion remains free to flow for a short time.

An alternative chemical toughening process involves forcing a surface layer of glass at least 0.1 mm thick into compression by ion exchange of the sodium ions in the glass surface with potassium ions (which are 30% larger), by immersion of the glass into a bath of molten potassium nitrate. Chemical toughening results in increased toughness compared with thermal tempering and can be applied to glass objects of complex shapes.

Disadvantages 

Tempered glass must be cut to size or pressed to shape before tempering, and cannot be re-worked once tempered. Polishing the edges or drilling holes in the glass is carried out before the tempering process starts. Because of the balanced stresses in the glass, damage to any portion will eventually result in the glass shattering into thumbnail-sized pieces. The glass is most susceptible to breakage due to damage at its edge, where the tensile stress is the greatest, but can also shatter in the event of a hard impact in the middle of the glass pane or if the impact is concentrated (for example, the glass is struck with a hardened point).

Using tempered glass can pose a security risk in some situations because of the tendency of the glass to shatter completely upon hard impact rather than leaving shards in the window frame.

The surface of tempered glass does exhibit surface waves caused by contact with flattening rollers, if it has been formed using this process. This waviness is a significant problem in manufacturing of thin film solar cells. The float glass process can be used to provide low-distortion sheets with very flat and parallel surfaces as an alternative for different glazing applications.

Nickel sulfide defects can cause spontaneous breakage of tempered glass years after its manufacturing.

History 
Francois Barthelemy Alfred Royer de la Bastie (1830–1901) of Paris, France is credited with first developing a method of tempering glass by quenching almost molten glass in a heated bath of oil or grease in 1874, the method patented in England on August 12, 1874, patent number 2783. Tempered glass is sometimes known as Bastie glass after de la Bastie. In 1877 the German Friedrich Siemens developed a different process, sometimes called compressed glass or Siemens glass, producing a tempered glass stronger than the Bastie process by pressing the glass in cool molds. The first patent on a whole process to make tempered glass was held by chemist Rudolph A. Seiden who was born in 1900 in Austria and emigrated to the United States in 1935.

Though the underlying mechanism was not known at the time, the effects of "tempering" glass have been known for centuries. In about 1660, Prince Rupert of the Rhine brought the discovery of what are now known as "Prince Rupert's Drops" to the attention of King Charles II. These are teardrop-shaped bits of glass which are produced by allowing a molten drop of glass to fall into a bucket of water, thereby rapidly cooling it. They can withstand a blow from a hammer on the bulbous end without breaking, but the drops will disintegrate explosively into powder if the tail end is even slightly damaged.

See also 
 Thermal stress
 Borosilicate glass
 Fire glass
 Superglass
 Low-iron glass
 Stained glass
 Lead glass

References 

Glass engineering and science
Glass types
Glass physics

pl:Hartowanie#Hartowanie szkła